Urodon is the scientific name of two genera of organisms and may refer to:

Urodon (beetle), a genus of insects in the family Anthribidae
Urodon (plant), a genus of plants in the family Fabaceae